The Aston Martin DB9 is a grand tourer produced by Aston Martin. Available both in coupé and a convertible bodystyles, the latter being known as the Volante, the DB9 was the successor to the DB7. It was first shown at the 2003 Frankfurt Auto Show, and was the first model built at Aston Martin's Gaydon facility.

The DB9, originally designed by Ian Callum and Henrik Fisker, has an aluminium construction. The chassis is the Ford-developed VH platform whilst the engine is the 5.9-litre V12 from the Vanquish. The 2013 model year facelift saw many improvements to the design, the engine and the overall driving experience.

Aston Martin Racing adapted the DB9 for sports car racing, producing the DBR9 for FIA GT1 and the DBRS9 for FIA GT3. These two cars are modified DB9 models adapted for motorsport; the interior features are removed and the aluminium body panels are replaced by carbon fibre panels. Additionally, the engine has been tweaked in both the cars to produce more horsepower and torque.

Production of the DB9 ended after 12 years in 2016, having been replaced by the DB11 which uses an all-new platform and engine.

Development and design

The DB9 was designed by Ian Callum and Henrik Fisker; the extent of each individual's contributions to the car has been disputed by both. The car was first introduced at the 2003 Frankfurt Motor Show. The letters "DB" are the initials of David Brown, the owner of Aston Martin for a significant part of its history. Although it succeeded the DB7, Aston Martin did not name the car DB8 due to fears that the name would suggest that the car was equipped with a V8 engine (the DB9 has a V12). It was also reported that Aston Martin believed that naming the car "DB8" would indicate a gradual evolution and misrepresent the car.

The DB9 is the first model to be built at Aston Martin's Gaydon facility in Warwickshire, England. In a 2007 interview, the then Aston Martin CEO Dr. Ulrich Bez stated that, though Aston Martin was traditionally a maker of more exclusive automobiles, he believed Aston Martin needed to be more visible and build more cars. At launch, Aston Martin planned to build between 1,400 and 1,500 cars per year.

In 2007, the DB9 was revised with upgraded electrical components which helped reliability, new front seat design, LED approach lights on the door handles and lowered suspension (8mm). The DB9 Volante no longer had a  top-speed limiter, allowing it to attain an unrestricted top speed of  should conditions allow.

The DB9 received a facelift in July 2008. Externally, the DB9 remained virtually unchanged.

Interior

The DB9's interior is upholstered in leather and has a walnut wood trim. In newer editions, the leather is additionally given hand-stitched accents and joins. On the dashboard, satnav and Bluetooth are standard in later models (options on earlier models). Later models also offered a Dolby Prologic sound system can be connected to satellite radio, a six-CD changer, an iPod connector, a USB connector, or an auxiliary input jack. This sound system can be upgraded to a Bang & Olufsen stereo.

The coupé comes standard with two front seats and rear seats. A seating package, which removes the back seats and replaces the front seats with lighter seats made of Kevlar and carbon fibre was available as an option.

Exterior
Made to follow the DB7 model, the DB9 is, according to Aston's initial press release, "a contemporary version of classic DB design elements and characteristics". It retains the traditional Aston Martin grille and side strakes, and the design attempts to keep the lines simple and refined. The boot of the car is pronounced, like that of the DB4 and DB5. At the front, DB9 is without a separate nose cone, and has no visible bumpers. The exterior skin is largely made of aluminium, though the front bumpers and bonnet are made of composite materials.

For the 2013 model year, Aston Martin made minor changes to the bodywork by adapting design cues from the 2011 Virage, including enlarging the recessed headlight clusters with bi-xenon lights and LED daytime running strips, widening the front splitter, updating the grille and side heat extractors, updating the LED rear lights with clear lenses and integrating a new rear spoiler with the boot lid.

Engine

The Aston Martin DB9 was initially launched equipped with a 5.9-litre V12 engine, already being used in the V12 Vanquish. The engine largely sits behind the front-axle line to improve weight distribution.

The DB9 could be equipped with either a six-speed conventional manual gearbox manufactured by Graziano Trasmissioni or a six-speed ZF Friedrichshafen 'Touchtronic' automatic gearbox featuring paddle-operated semi-automatic mode. The automatic gearbox increases the 0 to  acceleration time to 4.9 seconds, though the top speed remains the same. The 2009 model year featured a revised 'Touchtronic 2' gearbox, which offered faster gear shifts due to a new valve box and integrated transmission controls. The 0 to  acceleration time decreased to 4.6 seconds, an improvement of 0.3 seconds. The gearbox is rear-mounted and is driven by a carbon-fibre tail shaft inside a cast aluminium torque tube.

Chassis
The DB9 is the first Aston Martin model to be designed and developed on Ford's aluminium VH (vertical/horizontal) platform. The body structure is composed of aluminium and composite materials melded together by mechanically fixed self-piercing rivets and robotic assisted adhesive bonding techniques. The bonded aluminium structure is claimed to possess more than double the torsional rigidity of its predecessor's, despite being 25 percent lighter.

The DB9 also has anti-roll bars and double wishbone suspension, supported by coil springs. To keep the back-end in control under heavy acceleration or braking, the rear suspension has additional anti-squat and anti-lift technology. Later versions of the car also features three modes for the tuning: normal, for every-day use, sport, for more precise movement at the cost of ride comfort, and track, which furthers the effects of the sport setting.

Wheels
They were fitted with Bridgestone Potenza 235/40ZR19 up front and 275/35ZR19 on the back. The brakes are large Brembo four-piston calipers in the front and rear. Carbon ceramic brakes were an option.

The tyres are Pirelli P-Zero with codes of 245/35ZR20 and 295/30ZR20. The brakes are carbon ceramic with six-piston calipers at the front and four-piston calipers at the rear.

Variants

DB9 Volante

The Aston Martin DB9 Volante is the convertible version of the DB9 coupé. The chassis, though stiffer, uses the same base VH platform. To protect occupants from rollovers, the Volante has strengthened windshield pillars and two pop-up hoops behind the rear seats. The hoops cannot be disabled and will break the car's rear window if deployed. In an effort to improve the Volante's ride while cruising, Aston Martin softened the springs and lightened the anti-roll bars in the Volante, leading to a gentler suspension. The retractable roof of the Volante is made of folding fabric and takes 17 seconds for operation.

The coupé and Volante both share the same semi-automatic and automatic gearboxes and engine.

DB9 GT
The final edition of the DB9 called the DB9 GT was introduced in 2015. The 0 to  acceleration time is 4.4 seconds and 0 to  acceleration time is 10.2 seconds.

DB9 LM
To commemorate Aston Martin's GT1 victory at the 2007 24 Hours of Le Mans, Aston Martin introduced the DB9 LM (Le Mans) in the first quarter of 2008. The DB9 LM comes standard with the DB9's optional sports pack and is only available in coupé bodystyle equipped with the automatic transmission. The LM was only available in a special Sarthe Silver exterior colour, named after the Circuit de la Sarthe, where Le Mans is run, and has red brake calipers, a chromed mesh grill, and a special black leather interior, with red stitching and the Le Mans track stitched on the central console. The car is also fitted with the DBS' clear rear lights. Initially, a production of 124 cars was planned and the cars were to be supplied to dealers at the rate of one per dealer. However, some dealers did not take their allocation as a result, the total production amounted to 69 cars.

DB9 Carbon Black, Morning Frost, and Quantum Silver
Following the success of several special edition models of other Aston Martin cars, like the V12 Vantage Carbon Black and the DBS Carbon Black, Aston Martin announced three special edition models of the DB9 in 2011: the DB9 Carbon Black, Morning Frost, and Quantum Silver. All three models are denoted by a sill plaque bearing their respective names. All three models were available both as a coupé and a Volante.

The DB9 Carbon Black, as its name suggests, has a black paint finish and matching interior. This includes a black center console and interior door handles on the inside, and black grills, a black tailpipe, and black  10-spoke wheels on the outside. The interior also has numerous add-ons to make the car more sporty, including silver stitching for the leather and a polished glass gear stick. The exhaust has been modified to create a different sound to add to the sporty feel. The Carbon Black was only available as a six-speed automated manual.

The DB9 Morning Frost's paint finish is a pearlescent white. However, on the interior, the Morning Frost is fitted with metallic bronze leather and a black center console and interior door handles. On the outside, the Morning Frost has silver  10-spoke wheels, silver brake calipers, and silver grilles. Like the Carbon Black, the DB9 Morning Frost has a six-speed automated manual transmission.

The DB9 Quantum Silver uses a silver paint scheme also found on the DBS in Quantum of Solace, hence its name. Inside, the Quantum Silver shares the black center console and leather. On the outside, it also has black grills and  wheels. The Quantum Silver has the same automated manual transmission as its counterparts, and shares a modified sports exhaust with the Carbon Black.

DB9 Spyder Zagato Centennial (2013) 
At the firm's 100 year anniversary, Zagato presented a unique car based on the Aston Martin DB9 Volante. It was commissioned by American collector Peter Read and was painted green. It was revealed along with the Aston Martin DBS Coupe Zagato Centennial. The owner bought a US-spec 2013 Aston Martin DB9 Volante, which he immediately shipped to Zagato in Italy. The car sold for $693,000 (inclusive of applicable buyer's fee) with 2,300 miles in August 2015 at RM Sotheby's Monterey auction during car week. The car has carbon-ceramic brakes and its VIN number is SCFFDABM1DGB14756.

DB9 Vengeance by Kahn Design 
The DB9 Vengeance by Kahn Design is a series of cars modified by the British car modification firm Kahn Design based on the Aston Martin DB9.

Motorsport

DBR9

The DB9 has been adapted for use in sports car racing by Aston Martin Racing, a collaboration between Aston Martin and Prodrive. Called the DBR9, the car debuted in 2005. Most of the car's aluminium body panels have been replaced with carbon fibre panels, and several external features, like a front splitter and a rear wing, have been added to increase the car's downforce. The car has a basic interior with essential driver aids. Likewise, though the suspension's layout remains the same, it has been improved to racing specifications. The brakes are upgraded to Brembo carbon-carbon discs and six-piston calipers. The transmission in the DBR9 is a Xtrac six-speed sequential manual, containing a Salisbury friction-plate limited-slip differential, and the prop shaft made of carbon fibre.

The DBR9 won in its debut at the 2005 12 Hours of Sebring, and has gone on to take wins in the American Le Mans Series, Le Mans Series, FIA GT Championship, as well as the 24 Hours of Le Mans.

DBRS9

Aston Martin Racing also developed a variant of the DBR9 following FIA GT3 regulations. Called the DBRS9, the car shares carbon fibre bodywork and the chassis and suspension layout of the DBR9.

The DBRS9 competed in several endurance races, including the 24 Hours Nürburgring, Spa 24 Hours, and Malaysia Merdeka Endurance Race. The car additionally raced in the FIA GT3 European Championship for which it was designed before being replaced by a GT3 version of the V12 Vantage in 2011.

The DBRS9 was made available to consumers and included an adjustable driver's seat and steering.

Reception
Car critics have generally rated the DB9 coupé and Volante well, praising the car's luxurious interior and exterior design. On the British automotive show Top Gear, the DB9 is thought of highly. Notably, on the show's "Cool Wall" segment, the presenters called the DB9 "too cool" for the wall and gave it its own category called "The DB9 Fridge", a mini-refrigerator containing the car's card. While reviewing the Volante, Richard Hammond called the interior of the DB9 "one of the best known to man". He felt that the car was less stiff than the coupé, however, to the point that the car was "wobbly".

Both Edmunds.com and Road & Track critiqued the DB9 for not having as good handling as its competitors, noting that the car isn't stiff enough. However, Edmunds noted that while the Mercedes-Benz SL600 and SL55 AMG were objectively better cars, the DB9 was more desirable. When compared directly against other cars, like the Porsche 911 Turbo S Cabriolet and the Ford GT, the DB9 was ranked poorly, though the reviewer noted that comparing it against faster cars "highlighted its shortcomings". Likewise, when compared to the Bentley Continental GT, Mercedes-Benz CL600, and the Ferrari 612 Scaglietti F1, the DB9 ranked poorly again, though reviewers said that "despite its problems, the DB9 would be their personal choice". The issues with stiffness were largely fixed by later iterations of the DB9 as noted by Autoweek and Edmunds.

The DB9's interior has been called "regal" and "dazzling", with Edmunds saying, "[w]ords like 'rich' and 'crafted' just don't cut it, though 'decadent' and 'sculpted by the Almighty himself' get close". Critics liked the comfort of the almost racecar-like driver's seat. Reviewers complained about the back seats however, with Forbes saying "think of it more as a padded parcel shelf". Likewise, reviewers complained that the space for cargo was limited, though many quipped the small back seats could help hold luggage. Another common complaint was car's poor satnav system, which Automobile Magazine called the car's "Achilles heel", noting that "selecting a route is painful at best". Newer models contain a much improved satnav system sourced from Garmin.

References

Notes

Bibliography

External links

 Aston Martin DB9 – Official Aston Martin webpage
 

DB9
Grand tourers
Coupés
Rear-wheel-drive vehicles
Front mid-engine, rear-wheel-drive vehicles
Cars introduced in 2004
2010s cars
Convertibles
Henrik Fisker